This is a list of artists (animators, directors and producers) who have created stop-motion animation. Active years by approximation, mostly based on IMDb information and as much as possible concerning work in the field of animation. The original order of the list is based on the first year of activity.

See also
 Still motion
 List of stop motion films

References 

Notes

 Tayler, Richard. The Encyclopedia of Animation Techniques. Running Press, Philadelphia, 1996. 
 Lord, Peter and Brian Sibley. Creating 3-D Animation. Harry N. Abrams, New York, 1998. 
 Sibley, Brian. Chicken Run: Hatching the Movie. Harry N. Abrams, New York, 2000. 
 Smith, Dave. Disney A to Z. Hyperion Books, New York, 1998. 
 Maltin, Leonard Movie and Video Guide. Signet Reference Paperbacks, New American Library, Penguin Putnam, New York, 2006.

artists
Stop motion
Stop motion
Stop motion
.

ca:Stop-motion
cs:Stop motion
da:Stop-motion
de:Stop-Motion
es:Stop motion
fr:Animation en volume
it:Passo uno
he:סטופ מושן
nl:Stop-motion
ja:ストップモーション・アニメーション
no:Stop-motion
pl:Animacja poklatkowa
pt:Stop motion
ru:Кукольная анимация
simple:Stop-motion
sr:Кадар-по-кадар
fi:Stop motion
sv:Stop motion
te:స్టాప్ మోషన్ యానిమేషన్
th:สตอปโมชัน